This is a list of U.S. states and territories ranked by their coastline length. 30 states have a coastline: 23 with a coastline on the Arctic Ocean, Atlantic Ocean (including the Gulf of Mexico and Gulf of Maine), and/or Pacific Ocean, and 7 with a Great Lakes shoreline. New York has coasts on both the Great Lakes and the Atlantic Ocean. Smaller border lakes such as Lake Champlain or Lake of the Woods do not count. All of the five major U.S. territories have coastlines — three of them have a coastline on the Pacific Ocean, and two of them have a coastline on the Atlantic Ocean (Caribbean Sea). The U.S. Minor Outlying Islands also have coastlines.

Two separate measurements are used: method 1 only includes states with ocean coastline and excludes tidal inlets; method 2 includes Great Lake shoreline and the extra length from tidal inlets. For example, method 2 counts the Great Bay as part of New Hampshire's coastline, but method 1 does not.  Method 1 does not include the coastlines of the territories of the United States, while method 2 does.

The data for method 1 was retrieved from a CRS Report for Congress using data from U.S. Department of Commerce, National Oceanic and Atmospheric Administration, The Coastline of the United States, 1975.  This is based on measurements made using large-scale nautical charts. The figure for Connecticut was arrived at separately and may not reflect the correct comparative distance.

The data for method 2 is from a list maintained by the Office of Ocean and Coastal Resource Management of the National Oceanic and Atmospheric Administration (NOAA).  The state coastline lengths were computed by an unspecified method that includes tidal areas not included in the first method. These numbers also include the Great Lakes coastlines, which do not have similar tidal areas. Data for the U.S. Minor Outlying Islands is from the CIA World Factbook.

The figures also face the ambiguity inherent in all attempts at measuring coastlines, as expressed in the coastline paradox.



Table

Notes

See also
Coastline paradox
List of countries by length of coastline
How Long Is the Coast of Britain? Statistical Self-Similarity and Fractional Dimension

References

External links

Coastline
Coasts of the United States
Coastline
United States, Coastline
U.S. states and territories